The Western Australian Indigenous Art Awards was a non-acquisitive art award established by the Art Gallery of Western Australia and funded by the Government of Western Australia from 2008 to 2015, to support and encourage Indigenous Australian artists.

Entry was open to "all adult Aboriginal and Torres Strait Islander artists currently living in Australia, working in any theme or media, including (but not restricted to) painting on bark, canvas and paper, prints, sculpture, fibre art, ceramics, glass, photography, and digital media".

Past winners
In 2008, Patrick Tjungurrayi won the main prize and June Walkutjukurr won the WA Artist prize, and  the People's Choice award was won by Shane Pickett.

The 2009 winner of the main prize was Torres Strait Islander man Ricardo Idagi; the Western Australian prize winner was Wakartu Cory Surprise.

In 2015, Quandamooka artist Megan Cope won the main prize for her video installation The Blaktism, while Vincent Namatjira was one of the finalists.

References

Australian Aboriginal art
Awards honoring indigenous people
Awards established in 2008
2008 establishments in Australia